The canton of Maurs is an administrative division of the Cantal department, southern France. Its borders were modified at the French canton reorganisation which came into effect in March 2015. Its seat is in Maurs.

It consists of the following communes:
 
Boisset
Leynhac
Marcolès
Maurs
Montmurat
Puycapel
Quézac
Roannes-Saint-Mary
Rouziers
Saint-Antoine
Saint-Constant-Fournoulès
Saint-Étienne-de-Maurs
Saint-Julien-de-Toursac
Saint-Mamet-la-Salvetat
Saint-Santin-de-Maurs
Sansac-de-Marmiesse
Le Trioulou
Vitrac

References

Cantons of Cantal